Elena Sokolova (born 1980) is a Russian figure skater.

Elena Sokolova or Yelena Sokolova may also refer to:

Elena Sokolova (swimmer) (born 1991), Russian Olympic swimmer
Yelena Sokolova (long jumper) (born 1986), Russian long jumper
Yelena Sokolova (runner) (born 1979), Russian long-distance runner

See also
Elena (given name)
Yelena (name)